Dominic Iorfa (or Dominic Jorfa, born 1 October 1968) is a Nigerian former professional footballer who played as a striker. He was born in Gboko, Benue State.

Club career 

Iorfa has played professionally in England, Scotland, Turkey, Ireland and Belgium. Renowned for his electric pace but less than stunning control, he became a cult figure at many of the clubs played for, particularly at Peterborough United where his name is still occasionally shouted during dull periods of matches.

He signed for Queens Park Rangers in March 1990 for a transfer fee of £145,000 from Royal Antwerp. Whilst only playing 8 first team games for Rangers he certainly earned the affection of many of the Rangers fans, despite regularly featuring in recent years in lists of "Worst ever Rangers Players". His career at Rangers started brightly with him scoring a hat-trick on his debut for the reserves v Reading on 3 April 1990 in a 3–2 home win. A few weeks earlier he had scored another hat-trick in a reserve game on 13 February 1990 whilst on trial with Millwall versus Queens Park Rangers in a 4–3 victory for Millwall. This performance influenced Rangers to sign him. He made his first team debut coming on as substitute in the last match of the season in the 2–3 home defeat against Wimbledon on 5 May 1990. Dominic was lightning fast but he struggled to master the off side rule and eventually faded out of contention at Rangers with his last first team game being away to Tottenham Hotspur in a 2–0 defeat on 14 September 1991.

On his debut for Aylesbury United he scored 2 goals, wearing his yellow "banana" boots. In his next game he was about to enter the field of play as a substitute when he had an altercation with the linesman and was given a red card. He never played for Aylesbury again. 

He enjoyed a successful spell in the League of Ireland Premier Division with Waterford United and was adored by the fans, despite missing a penalty on his debut. To this day, his yellow Puma boots are still worn by the clubs kitman who received the boots off Iorfa shortly before he left the club.

Currently he is a member of the board of the NFA and the chairman of Lobi Stars F.C.

International career 
Iorfa represented Nigeria on four occasions, including a starting place in the third-place playoff match against Mexico at the 1995 King Fahd Cup. He had previously featured in the 1988 Summer Olympics while playing twice for the Nigeria under-23 team.

Personal life 
His son, also named Dominic Iorfa, plays as a defender for Sheffield Wednesday; he has represented England at under-21, under-20 and under-18 levels.

References 

1968 births
Falkirk F.C. players
Galatasaray S.K. footballers
Living people
Association football forwards
Nigerian footballers
Nigerian expatriate footballers
Expatriate footballers in England
Peterborough United F.C. players
Queens Park Rangers F.C. players
Royal Antwerp F.C. players
Southend United F.C. players
Billericay Town F.C. players
Cork City F.C. players
Waterford F.C. players
English Football League players
Süper Lig players
League of Ireland players
Belgian Pro League players
Nigerian expatriate sportspeople in Turkey
Expatriate footballers in Belgium
Nigerian expatriate sportspeople in Hong Kong
Ranchers Bees F.C. players
Expatriate association footballers in the Republic of Ireland
Expatriate footballers in Turkey
Nigerian expatriate sportspeople in England
Expatriate footballers in Scotland
Nigerian expatriate sportspeople in Ireland
Expatriate footballers in Hong Kong
Lobi Stars F.C. players
Expatriate footballers in China
1995 King Fahd Cup players
Footballers at the 1988 Summer Olympics
Olympic footballers of Nigeria
Guangzhou F.C. players
Nigerian expatriate sportspeople in China
Aylesbury United F.C. players
Nigerian expatriate sportspeople in Scotland
Nigerian expatriate sportspeople in Belgium
Double Flower FA players
Hong Kong First Division League players
Scottish Football League players
BCC Lions F.C. players
People from Gboko
Abiola Babes F.C. players
Nigeria international footballers